Davisville is an unincorporated community located within Chesterfield Township in Burlington County, New Jersey, United States. The settlement, located at the intersection of County Route 528 and Chesterfield-Arneytown Road (CR 664), is in a rural area in the eastern portion of the township. It consists mainly of farmland with some houses dotting the few roads that pass through the area.

References

Chesterfield Township, New Jersey
Unincorporated communities in Burlington County, New Jersey
Unincorporated communities in New Jersey